Brachurapteryx is a genus of moths in the family Geometridae.

Species
 Brachurapteryx breviaria (Hübner, [1831])

References
 Brachurapteryx at Markku Savela's Lepidoptera and Some Other Life Forms
Natural History Museum Lepidoptera genus database

Ennominae